Gabrielle Nicole Logan  (née Yorath; born 24 April 1973) is a Welsh television and radio presenter, and a former rhythmic gymnast who represented Wales and Great Britain. She hosted Final Score for BBC Sport from 2009 until 2013. She has also presented live sports events for the BBC, including a revived episode of Superstars in December 2012 and the London Marathon since 2015. Since 2013, she has co-hosted Sports Personality of the Year for the BBC and she presented the second series of The Edge in 2015.

Early life
Gabrielle Nicole Logan was born on 24 April 1973 in Leeds in the West Riding of Yorkshire to former Wales international footballer and manager Terry Yorath and his wife, Christine. At the time, Yorath was playing for Leeds United. The family moved frequently because her father played for a number of British teams as well as in Canada with the Vancouver Whitecaps. She attended  Cardinal Heenan High School and Notre Dame Sixth Form College in Leeds.

Logan played netball at school and at university and also competed in the high jump, but the peak of her sporting career was when she placed 11th in rhythmic gymnastics representing Wales at the 1990 Commonwealth Games in Auckland.

Logan became interested in football during her regular attendances at her father's matches. Her mother went out of a "sense of duty". Along with her brother and sister, Logan was in the crowd at Valley Parade on 11 May 1985, the day of the Bradford City stadium fire.  She had left the stand only moments before the fire took hold and watched the unfolding disaster.

Logan's debut TV appearance was when she was chosen as the Leeds Rose for the 1991 Rose of Tralee competition.

Logan runs and plays golf. She is a supporter of Newcastle United, dating back to her time at Durham University, when her boyfriend was a fan. She remembers her first match as Newcastle's 1–0 Premier League victory over Everton on 25 August 1993 and made visits by air or rail to St James' Park throughout the 1990s and early 2000s, including Newcastle's 5–0 win over Manchester United on 20 October 1996.

Early career
After university, Logan began presenting on Metro Radio in Newcastle, from where she was offered a job as a presenter on Sky Sports in 1996. She worked there until 1998, when she joined the ITV TV network.

Television

ITV
Logan's career came to notice when she fronted On the Ball. Logan was one of a small number of female sports presenters to have made the transition to terrestrial television. After ITV lost the terrestrial rights to the Premier League, she presented their  UEFA Champions League coverage, including the 2005 and 2006 finals, between A.C. Milan and Liverpool, and Arsenal and Barcelona, respectively. Logan left ITV for BBC Sport in December 2006, In 2003, she reported on the Rugby World Cup. Also that year, Logan presented a programme called Britain's Brilliant Prodigies featuring a young Jessie J.

Logan stepped in for Melanie Sykes on 6 July 2004 when she went on maternity leave partway through the third series of game show The Vault.

Gabby co-hosted the celebrity diving show Splash! on ITV, alongside Vernon Kay and Olympic diver Tom Daley from 2013 until 2014.

In 2015, Logan returned to ITV for reality series Flockstars, a show she later admitted was her "biggest disappointment".

BBC
Logan started  presenting for BBC Sport on 27 January 2007, presenting coverage of the FA Cup fourth round tie between Luton Town and Blackburn Rovers. She continues to regularly present and report on live football for the BBC and Logan also deputises for Gary Lineker on Match of the Day. Logan hosted Final Score from 2009 until 2013. She reported from the England Camp for the 2010 World Cup, Euro 2012 and World Cup 2014 while also being a pitchside reporter at England matches.

In 2008 Logan replaced Craig Doyle as host of the BBC's Six Nations Championship coverage. She had previously reported on the 2003 Rugby World Cup for ITV.

Logan became the main host of athletics for BBC Sport. She has hosted live coverage of the World Athletics Championships in 2013, and the European Athletics Championships and Commonwealth Games in 2014. She has also hosted the annual IAAF Diamond League competition. 

Logan has hosted BBC Olympic Games coverage at Beijing 2008, London 2012, Rio 2016, Tokyo 2021. She has also hosted live coverage of other sporting events such as the 2013 Aquatics World Championships

Since 2009, Logan has been a frequent stand-in presenter on The One Show on BBC One. Logan stated that she was once criticised by a BBC executive for wearing "too sexy boots".

In August 2013, Logan began hosting the BBC One series I Love My Country, featuring team captains Micky Flanagan and Frank Skinner on Saturday evenings. In October 2013, the programme was axed due to largely negative press reviews and poor viewing figures.

In September 2013, the BBC announced that, as of 2013, Logan would replace Sue Barker as one of the presenters for the annual BBC Sports Personality of the Year.

In March 2015, Logan hosted Let's Play Darts for Comic Relief for BBC Two. The show returned for a second series in February 2016.

She presented live coverage of the 2015 London Marathon, broadcast on BBC One on 26 April, the 2016 London Marathon on 24 April and the 2017 London Marathon on 23 April. In August 2015, she was the main presenter for BBC's coverage of the IAAF World Championships in Athletics from Beijing.

Logan presented the second series of the BBC game show The Edge in 2015. She replaced Mark Benton who hosted series 1.

In 2016, Logan was part of the presenting team for The Invictus Games on BBC One. She was also a part of the media team during the BBC's coverage of the 2016 UEFA European Championship in France.

In 2017 she hosted the BBC IAAF coverage in London.

In 2022 Logan hosted coverage of the Women's Six Nations Championship.

Channel 5
In June 2011, while still presenting the sports results shows for BBC One on Saturdays, Logan joined Channel 5 to present a discussion and magazine show following  The Wright Stuff at 11:10 am each weekday initially called The Wright Stuff Extra, and later renamed as Live with Gabby. On 5 April 2012, the show tweeted to confirm that Logan was leaving the programme.

Filmography

Television

Guest appearances

Who Wants to Be a Millionaire? (2002, 2010, 2021)
Celebrity Stars in Their Eyes (2002)
All Star Family Fortunes (2006)
8 Out of 10 Cats (2008, 2010, 2012, 2014, 2016)
Would I Lie to You? (2008, 2009, 2012, 2015, 2017, 2019)
Never Mind the Buzzcocks (2009, 2015)
They Think It's All Over: Comic Relief Special (2011)
Wall of Fame (2011)
Shooting Stars (2011)
Room 101 (2012, 2017)
The Angelos Epithemiou Show (2012)
The Big Fat Quiz of the Year (2012)
All Star Mr & Mrs (2013)
The Last Leg (2013)
Was It Something I Said? (2013)
Have I Got News for You (2013)
That Puppet Game Show (2014)
Through the Keyhole (2014)
Pointless Celebrities (2015, 2016)
Celebrity Squares (2015)
Alan Carr's 12 Stars of Christmas (2016)
Insert Name Here (2017) 
Jack Dee's Inauguration Helpdesk (2017)
Don't Ask Me Ask Britain (2017)
Britain's Favourite Dogs: Top 100 (2018)
Richard Osman's House of Games (2021)
Blankety Blank (2022)
The John Bishop Show (2023)
Celebrity Catchphrase (2023)

Radio
Logan has worked on BBC Radio 5 Live, where she presented a lunchtime show from January 2010. Her previous Sunday morning was taken over by Kate Silverton. 

In light of the move of BBC Radio 5 Live from London to MediaCityUK in Salford, Logan left her weekday show in April 2011 due to other BBC work and family commitments. She was replaced by Shelagh Fogarty.

On 12 April 2009, she presented the BBC Radio 4 Appeal on behalf of St John's Catholic School for the Deaf.

Political views
In August 2014, Logan was one of 200 public figures who were signatories to a letter to The Guardian expressing their hope that Scotland would vote to remain part of the United Kingdom in September's referendum on that issue.

Other work

In December 2012, Logan was appointed as a non-executive director of Perform Group.

In 2014, Logan helped launch Tesco's Farm to Fork initiative.

Logan is the voice-over for the MegaRed heart health commercial advertisements.

In April 2022, Logan announced that her memoir, The First Half, would be published in the autumn.

Honours, awards and recognition
Logan has won "Sports Presenter of the Year" four times at the Television and Radio Industries Club Awards in 2000, 2002, 2004, and in 2014, while also being nominated a further three times in 2007, 2008, and in 2010. Gabby Logan was crowned "Tesco Celebrity Mum of the Year" in March 2012. Logan received a longlist nomination for "Most Popular Entertainment Presenter" at the 2014 National Television Awards She was also nominated for "Sports Presenter, Commentator or Pundit" at the 2014 Royal Television Society Awards, losing out to Gary Neville but did win "Sports Programme" as part of the BBC Athletics team.

Upon becoming one of the first female sports anchors to break into terrestrial television in the 1990s, Logan has received praise from many of her fellow professionals such as Terry Venables, Ally McCoist and Des Lynam. Her natural style of broadcasting, combined with her relaxed demeanor and ability to banter with whichever ex-pro whom she is working alongside, has made Logan a hugely popular figure on TV.

Logan, along with Clare Balding, received praise for their commentary during the coverage of the 2012 Summer Olympics. Politician Boris Johnson praised Logan's contribution during the BBC's coverage of the London Games, also saying that his favourite part of coverage was the late-night summary with Gabby Logan.

Logan was appointed Member of the Order of the British Empire (MBE) in the 2020 New Year Honours for services to sports broadcasting and the promotion of women in sport.

Personal life
In 1992, Logan's 15-year-old brother Daniel collapsed and died from hypertrophic cardiomyopathy. Logan has actively appealed for the Daniel Yorath Appeal, which raises funds for the treatment and detection of the condition.

Her brother Jordan Yorath (born 1986) played football for England Universities in 2008, and for Sheffield Wednesday, Halifax Town and  Wakefield F.C.. Logan's sister, Louise (born 1974), was a performer in Cirque Du Soleil's Zumanity show.

Logan married former Scotland international rugby union player Kenny Logan on 19 July 2001. She has said that meeting her husband was a motivation to exercise regularly again. The couple live in Beaconsfield, Buckinghamshire.

On 28 July 2005, after undergoing IVF treatment, Logan gave birth to twins, son Reuben and daughter Lois.

In June 2012, Logan was named by The Times newspaper as one of several people to have put money into a film and tax avoidance scheme.

In January 2013, Logan was named the first Chancellor of Leeds Trinity University. In November 2017 it was announced that Logan would step down from this role in January 2018 after five years.

Charity
Logan is currently a patron of The Disabilities Trust, The Prince's Trust, St John's Catholic School for the Deaf, Great Ormond Street Hospital and Newcastle United Foundation. She was named the President of Muscular Dystrophy UK in 2018. She and her husband Kenny Logan are past presidents of the children's charity Sparks.

References

External links
 – official site

Midpoint podcast

Living people
1973 births
Alumni of the College of St Hild and St Bede, Durham
BBC sports presenters and reporters
BBC television presenters
British association football commentators
British people of Welsh descent
British rhythmic gymnasts
British sports broadcasters
Commonwealth Games competitors for Wales
Gymnasts at the 1990 Commonwealth Games
Members of the Order of the British Empire
People associated with Leeds Trinity University
People associated with the Royal National College for the Blind
People educated at Cardinal Heenan Catholic High School, Leeds
Rugby union players' wives and girlfriends
Sportspeople from Leeds
Welsh gymnasts
WFTV Award winners